Late Pass is the third studio album by American hip hop artist Jel. It was released on Anticon on August 20, 2013. Music videos were created for "Look Up", "Breathe", and "Steady".

Critical reception
Bram E. Gieben of The Skinny gave the album 5 stars out of 5, saying, "this is an album that demands to be listened to as a whole, preferably on vinyl, and experienced in its raw, uncut form in the live arena." Ian S. Port of SF Weekly said, "The mood is dark, the beats are impeccably constructed, and his bleak rhymes are delivered in a mumbling deadpan, often barely present in the mix."

Track listing

Personnel
Credits adapted from liner notes.

 Jel – writing, performance, production, arrangement, mixing, Jel logo
 Odd Nosdam – production, arrangement, mixing, cover design
 Jesse Nichols – final mixing
 Daddy Kev – mastering
 Bre'r – guitar (6)

References

External links
 

2013 albums
Jel (music producer) albums
Anticon albums